Benzoni is an Italian surname. Notable people with the surname include:

Giovanni Maria Benzoni (1809–1873), Italian sculptor
Girolamo Benzoni 16th-century Italian merchant and adventurer
Juliette Benzoni (1920–2016), French writer
Leonardo Benzoni (died 1552), Italian Roman Catholic bishop
Martino Benzoni (1451–1492), Italian sculptor
Rutilio Benzoni (1542–1613), Italian  Roman Catholic bishop
Sylvie Benzoni (born 1967), French mathematician

Italian-language surnames